Githmark is a surname. Notable people with the surname include: 

Ellen Githmark, Norwegian curler
Ingvill Githmark, Norwegian curler
Linn Githmark (born 1982), Norwegian curler

See also
Gitmark

Norwegian-language surnames